The Junior women's race at the 2010 IAAF World Cross Country Championships was held at the Myślęcinek Park in Bydgoszcz, Poland, on March 28, 2010.  Reports of the event were given in the Herald and for the IAAF.

Complete results for individuals, and for teams were published.

Race results

Junior women's race (5.833 km)

Individual

Teams

Note: Athletes in parentheses did not score for the team result.

Participation
According to an unofficial count, 95 athletes from 26 countries participated in the Junior women's race.  This is in agreement with the official numbers as published.

 (6)
 (2)
 (2)
 (1)
 (1)
 (6)
 (6)
 (4)
 (2)
 (6)
 (1)
 (1)
 (6)
 (1)
 (1)
 (3)
 (1)
 (6)
 (1)
 (6)
 (5)
 (4)
 (6)
 (5)
 (6)
 (6)

See also
 2010 IAAF World Cross Country Championships – Senior men's race
 2010 IAAF World Cross Country Championships – Junior men's race
 2010 IAAF World Cross Country Championships – Senior women's race

References

2010
2010 IAAF World Cross Country Championships
2010 in women's athletics
2010 in youth sport